The 2013 FIBA Asia Championship for Women was the qualifying tournament for FIBA Asia at the 2014 FIBA World Championship for Women in Turkey. The tournament was held in Bangkok, Thailand from October 27 to November 3.

The championship was divided into two levels: Level I and Level II. The two lowest finishers of Level I met the top two finishers of Level II to determine which teams qualify for the top Level of the 2015 Championship. The losers were relegated to Level II.

Japan defeated
South Korea 65–43 in the final to capture their second title.

Participating teams 
According to FIBA Asia Rules, the number of participating teams in the FIBA Asia Championship for Women was set at twelve. In order to balance the level of competitions, the Championship shall be played in two levels: Level I and Level II. The number of the teams in Level I is set at six. The six teams of Level I are set with reference to the 2011 FIBA Asia Championship for Women. The six teams of Level II are set with reference to the first six teams registered with respect to the deadlines.

Lebanon were supposed to compete but were disallowed due to the suspension of their federation. Kazakhstan, the team that they beat in the 2011 qualifying round, were promoted to Level I from Level II to replace the Lebanese's vacated place. Kazakhstan's place in Level II was taken over by the Philippines, the first team on the waiting list.
North Korea were supposed to compete but withdrew; they were replaced by Hong Kong, the second team on the waiting list.

Squads

Each team has twelve players on its roster. FIBA permits one naturalised player for each team.

Preliminary round

Level I

|}

Level II

|}

Qualifying round
Winners are promoted to Level I of the 2015 FIBA Asia Championship for Women.

Final round
Top three teams qualify to the 2014 FIBA World Championship for Women.

Semifinals

Third place game

Final

Final standing

Awards

Most Valuable Player:  Ramu Tokashiki

All-Star Team:

 PG –  Asami Yoshida
 SG –  Beon Yeon-Ha
 SF –  Lu Wen
 PF –  Yuka Mamiya
 C –  Ramu Tokashiki

References

External links
Official website

2013
2013 in women's basketball
2013–14 in Asian basketball
International women's basketball competitions hosted by Thailand
2013–14 in Thai basketball